The 31st edition of the World Allround Speed Skating Championships for Women took place on 28 February and 1 March in West Allis at the State Fair Park ice rink.

Title holder was Lāsma Kauniste from the USSR.

Distance medalists

Classification

 * = Fall

Source:

References

1970 World Women's Allround
Women's World Allround Championships
Women's World Allround Speed Skating Championships
Women's World Allround Speed Skating Championships
Women's World Allround Speed Skating Championships
International speed skating competitions hosted by the United States
Sports competitions in Wisconsin

Attribution
In Dutch